Edite de Fátima Santos Marreiros Estrela, GCIH (born Belver; 28 October 1949) is a Portuguese politician of the Socialist Party who has been serving as a member of the Parliament of Portugal since the 2015 elections. She is a currently the parliament's vice president

Estrela was previously a Member of the European Parliament from 2004 until 2014. She was also the Mayor of Sintra from 1994 and 2002 and ateacher of literature.

Political career

Member of the European Parliament, 2004–2014 
During her time in the European Parliament, Estrela was a member of the Committee on Women's Rights and Gender Equality and the Committee on the Environment, Public Health and Food Safety.

From 2009 until 2010, Estrela served as the parliament's rapporteur on draft legislation on parental leave. In 2013 she wrote a controversial parliamentary report on sexual and reproductive health and rights, which was narrowly rejected in the European Parliament.

In addition to her committee assignments, Estrela was part of the parliament's delegation for relations with the Mercosur countries (2009–2014), to the Euro-Latin American Parliamentary Assembly (2007–2014) and for relations with the countries of Central America (2007–2009).

Member of the Parliament of Portugal, 2015–present 
In addition to her role in parliament, Estrela has been serving as a member of the Portuguese delegation to the Parliamentary Assembly of the Council of Europe since 2016. As a member of the Socialist Party, she is part of the Socialists, Democrats and Greens Group. 

On the Assembly, Estrela serves on the Committee on the Honouring of Obligations and Commitments by Member States of the Council of Europe (since 2021); the Sub-Committee on Public Health and Sustainable Development (since 2020); the Sub-Committee on Gender Equality (since 2019); the Sub-Committee on the Rights of Minorities (since 2019); the Committee on Social Affairs, Health and Sustainable Development (since 2018); the Committee on Equality and Non-Discrimination (since 2018); and the Sub-Committee on Children (since 2018). She is also the Assembly's rapporteur on climate change, Romania and Georgia. Since 2022, she has been one of the Assembly’s vice-presidents, under the leadership of president Tiny Kox.

References

1949 births
Living people
MEPs for Portugal 2004–2009
MEPs for Portugal 2009–2014
21st-century women MEPs for Portugal
Socialist Party (Portugal) MEPs
Portuguese socialist feminists
Mayors of places in Portugal
Women mayors of places in Portugal
People from Carrazeda de Ansiães